At the 1908 Summer Olympics, two rackets events were contested. Only British players participated in the competitions.

Medal summary

Participating nations
A total of seven rackets players from only one nation competed at the London Games:

Medal table
Sources:

See also
List of Olympic venues in discontinued events

References

International Olympic Committee results database

External links
 

 
1908 Summer Olympics events
1908
Discontinued sports at the Summer Olympics